The Order of the Redeemer, also known as the Order of the Saviour, is an order of merit of Greece. The Order of the Redeemer is the oldest and highest decoration awarded by the modern Greek state.

Establishment 
The establishment of the Order of the Redeemer was decided by the Fourth National Assembly at Argos in 1829, during the final year of the Greek War of Independence. The decision was not immediately implemented, however, and the relevant decree was signed in Nafplio by the Regency Council (Josef Ludwig von Armansperg, Karl von Abel and Georg Ludwig von Maurer) in the name of King Otto on May 20, 1833. According to the decree of establishment, the name of the Order "shall recall the, by divine assistance miraculously and fortuitously accomplished, salvation of Greece".

Grades and award criteria 
Since its establishment in 1833, and in common with all Greek orders of merit, the Order of the Redeemer has five classes:
 Grand Cross – wears the badge of the Order on a sash on the right shoulder, and the star of the Order on the left chest;
 Grand Commander – wears the badge of the Order on a necklet, and the star of the Order on the right chest;
 Commander - wears the badge of the Order on a necklet;
 Gold Cross – wears the badge on a ribbon on the left chest;
 Silver Cross – wears the badge on a ribbon on the left chest.

According to the original decree, the Order was to be awarded to those Greek citizens who took part in the War of Independence, or "who should distinguish themselves henceforth in any branch of public service, in the army and navy, in the diplomatic and judicial corps, in public administration, in the arts, science, agriculture and industry, commerce, or should distinguish themselves in any other social field through outstanding civic virtue, and through illustrious services to the Throne, for the Glory of the Hellenic name and for the welfare of the fatherland", while foreigners were admitted either for past services to Greece, or due to their ability "to bring honour to the Order, through their outstanding personal virtues and excellence".

The original decree set specific limits on the number of awards: while the Silver Cross could be awarded at will, Gold Crosses were limited to 120, Commanders to 30, Grand Commanders to 20, and Grand Crosses to 12. Foreign recipients and princes of the Greek royal family did not count to these totals. In modern times, in practice the Grand Cross is awarded only to foreign heads of state.

The first person to be awarded the Grand Cross of the Order of the Redeemer was King Ludwig I of Bavaria, the father of King Otto, in 1833. Other distinguished recipients included Andreas Miaoulis in 1835, Baron Guenther Heinrich von Berg on 21 February 1837 Petrobey Mavromichalis, Alexandros Mavrokordatos and Lazaros Kountouriotis in 1836, Andreas Zaimis, Theodoros Kolokotronis and Georgios Kountouriotis in 1837, and Konstantinos Kanaris in 1864.

Insignia
The form of the various insignias has been altered a number of times since the establishment of the order, the most obvious change being the removal of the crown during the periods of republican rule. The present form of insignias is regulated by Presidential Decree 849/1975.

The original decree of 1833 described the badge of the Order as consisting of a white enamelled Maltese cross (silver for the Silver Cross, gold for the higher grades), surmounted by a crown, set on a green enamelled wreath, one half of which is an oak branch and the other half a laurel branch. The obverse featured a white cross on a blue background (the coat of arms of Greece) with Otto's Bavarian arms in an inescutcheon in the centre, surrounded by this inscription on an outer ring:  ("Thy right hand, O Lord, is become glorious in power", Exodus, 15:6). The reverse featured a portrait of Otto with the circular inscription:  ("Otto, King of Greece").

After Otto's deposition in 1863, his portrait was removed and substituted by an icon of Jesus, the Redeemer of Orthodox Christian soteriology. This resulted in the wearing of this side as the obverse, with the national coat of arms (purged of the Bavarian escutcheon) relegated to the reverse, and the inscriptions correspondingly changed: the obverse's inscription remained in place, and the reverse came to feature a new inscription:  ("The IV National Assembly of the Hellenes at Argos – 1829").

The star of the Order is an eight-pointed faceted silver star with the same central disc as on the badge of the Order. At first the stars were embroidered, but eventually, they were made of solid silver, a practice that continues to this day.

The ribbon of the Order is light blue, edged with white, reflecting the national colours of Greece.

Recipients 

 Prince Aage, Count of Rosenborg
 Prince Adalbert of Bavaria (1828–1875)
 Prince Adalbert of Prussia (1811–1873)
 Alois Lexa von Aehrenthal
 Prince Albert of Prussia (1809–1872)
 Archduke Albrecht, Duke of Teschen
 Alexander I of Yugoslavia
 Alexander II of Russia
 Alexander III of Russia
 Alexander Frederick, Landgrave of Hesse
 Alexander of Battenberg
 Alexander of Greece
 Prince Alexander of Hesse and by Rhine
 Princess Alexia of Greece and Denmark
 Alfred, 2nd Prince of Montenuovo
 Gyula Andrássy
 Prince Andrew of Greece and Denmark
 Prince Arthur of Connaught
 Asa Jennings
 Prince Axel of Denmark
 Maximilian de Beauharnais, 3rd Duke of Leuchtenberg
 Prince Oscar Bernadotte
 Friedrich Ferdinand von Beust
 Herbert von Bismarck
 Otto von Bismarck
 Walther Bronsart von Schellendorff
 Bernhard von Bülow
 Carl XVI Gustaf
 Prince Carl, Duke of Västergötland
 Carol I of Romania
 Charles XV
 Charles Augustus, Hereditary Grand Duke of Saxe-Weimar-Eisenach (1844–1894)
 Prince Charles, Count of Flanders
 Prince Charles of Prussia
 Chiang Kai-shek
 Christian IX of Denmark
 Christian X of Denmark
 Richard Church (general)
 Constantine I of Greece
 Prince Constantine Alexios of Greece and Denmark
 Constantine II of Greece
 Gerasimos Contomichalos
 Spyromilios
 John Cowans
 Maximilian Daublebsky von Sterneck
 Adolf von Deines
 Jules de Trooz
 Grand Duke Dmitry Konstantinovich of Russia
 Prince Eduard of Saxe-Altenburg
 Edward VII of the United Kingdom
 Alfred Mordaunt Egerton
 Prince Eitel Friedrich of Prussia
 Elizabeth II
 Ernest Louis, Grand Duke of Hesse
 Gaston Errembault de Dudzeele
 Prince Eugen, Duke of Närke
 Theoklitos Farmakidis
 Franz Joseph II, Prince of Liechtenstein
 Frederick VIII of Denmark
 Frederick IX of Denmark
 Frederick Francis II, Grand Duke of Mecklenburg-Schwerin
 Frederick Francis III, Grand Duke of Mecklenburg-Schwerin
 Frederick I, Duke of Anhalt
 Frederick III, German Emperor
 Prince Frederick of Hohenzollern-Sigmaringen
 Frederick William IV of Prussia
 Frederick William, Grand Duke of Mecklenburg-Strelitz
 Friedrich Ferdinand, Duke of Schleswig-Holstein
 Prince Friedrich Leopold of Prussia
 George I of Greece
 George II of Greece
 George V
 Boutros Ghali
 Agenor Maria Gołuchowski
 Gustaf V
 Gustaf VI Adolf
 Prince Gustav of Denmark
 Gustav, Prince of Vasa
 Prince Harald of Denmark
 Prince Henry of Prussia (1862–1929)
 Duke Henry of Mecklenburg-Schwerin
 Hirohito
 Miklós Horthy
 Dietrich von Hülsen-Haeseler
 Sergěj Ingr (Grand Commander, 1932)
 Archduke John of Austria
 Prince Johann of Schleswig-Holstein-Sonderburg-Glücksburg
 Archduke Johann Salvator of Austria
 Duke John Albert of Mecklenburg
 Joseph, Duke of Saxe-Altenburg
 Juliana of the Netherlands
 Theophilos Kairis
 Konstantinos Kanaris
 Miltiadis Kanaris
 Ilias Kanellopoulos
 Karl Anton, Prince of Hohenzollern
 Prince Karl Theodor of Bavaria
 Gustav von Kessel
 Grand Duke Kirill Vladimirovich of Russia
 Knud, Hereditary Prince of Denmark
 Theodoros Kolokotronis
 Grand Duke Konstantin Konstantinovich of Russia
 Konstantin of Hohenlohe-Schillingsfürst
 Georgios Kountouriotis
 Lazaros Kountouriotis
 Auguste, Baron Lambermont
 Leopold I of Belgium
 Leopold II of Belgium
 Leopold III of Belgium
 Prince Leopold, Duke of Albany
 Anastasios Londos
 Louis IV, Grand Duke of Hesse
 Prince Louis of Battenberg
 A. Maurice Low
 Ludwig I of Bavaria
 Archduke Ludwig Viktor of Austria
 Luís I of Portugal
 Luitpold, Prince Regent of Bavaria
 Emmanuel Macron
 Sergio Mattarella
 Alexandros Mavrokordatos
 Petrobey Mavromichalis
 Maximilian I of Mexico
 Duke Maximilian Joseph in Bavaria
 Emperor Meiji
 Ioannis Metaxas
 Andreas Miaoulis
 Grand Duke Michael Alexandrovich of Russia
 Milan I of Serbia
 Zygmunt Mineyko
 Konstantinos Minas
 Prince Moritz of Saxe-Altenburg
 August Myhrberg
 Napoleon III
 Nicholas II of Russia
 Grand Duke Nicholas Mikhailovich of Russia
 Grand Duke Nicholas Nikolaevich of Russia (1831–1891)
 Prince Nikolaos of Greece and Denmark
 Olga Constantinovna of Russia
 Oscar II
 Otto of Bavaria
 Otto of Greece
 Paul of Greece
 Pavlos, Crown Prince of Greece
 Philippe of Belgium
 Queen Mathilde of Belgium
 Pedro II of Brazil
 Georgios Pentzikis
 Duke Peter of Oldenburg
 Nicolae Petrescu-Comnen
 Prince Philip, Duke of Edinburgh
 Hans von Plessen
 François Pouqueville
 Prince Frederick William of Hesse-Kassel
 Patrick Quinn (Metropolitan Police officer)
 Joseph Radetzky von Radetz
 Archduke Rainer Ferdinand of Austria
 Rudolf, Crown Prince of Austria
 Spyridon Samaras
 Gustav von Senden-Bibran
 Simeon Saxe-Coburg-Gotha
 Konstantinos Smolenskis
 Leonidas Smolents
 Dionysios Solomos
 Hermann von Spaun
 Stepa Stepanović
 Tomáš Garrigue Masaryk
 Harold Stevens (broadcaster)
 Ludwig Freiherr von und zu der Tann-Rathsamhausen
 Georgios Theocharis
 Patriarch Theophilos III of Jerusalem
 Alfred von Tirpitz
 Umberto II of Italy
 Prince Valdemar of Denmark
 Prince Viggo, Count of Rosenborg
 Étienne de Villaret
 Vittorio Emanuele, Prince of Naples
 John Weston (pioneer aviator and motor caravanner)
 Wilhelm II, German Emperor
 Wilhelm, German Crown Prince
 Wilhelmina of the Netherlands
 Willem-Alexander of the Netherlands
 Queen Máxima of the Netherlands
 William I, German Emperor
 William, Prince of Hohenzollern
 Arthur Winnington-Ingram
 Sergei Witte
 Duke Eugen of Württemberg (1846–1877)
 Basil Zaharoff
 Todor Zhivkov
 August zu Eulenburg
 Emmanouil Zymvrakakis
 Emir Abdelkader (1808-1883)
 Joice NanKivell Loch

References

Further reading
 George J. Beldecos, "Hellenic Orders, Decorations and Medals", pub. Hellenic War Museum, Athens 1991, .

External links

 The Greek Royal Orders

Orders, decorations, and medals of Greece
1833 establishments in Greece
Awards established in 1833
Redeemer